The History of the Saracen Empires is a book written by Simon Ockley of Cambridge University and first published in the early 18th century. The book has been reprinted many times including at London in 1894. It was published in two volumes that appeared a decade apart.

The author

Simon Ockley, vicar of Swavesey, Cambridgeshire, devoted himself from an early age to the study of eastern languages and customs and was appointed Sir Thomas Adams Professor of Arabic at Cambridge in 1711. The first volume of his work generally known as The History of the Saracens, appeared in 1708 as  Conquest of Syria, Persia, and Egypt by the Saracens, the second in 1718, with an introduction dated from Cambridge Castle, where he was then imprisoned for debt. Edward Gibbon, who admired and used his work, speaks of his fate as “unworthy of the man and of his country.” His History extends from the death of Mahomet, 632, to that of Abd al-Malik ibn Marwan, 705; the work was cut short by the author's death in 1720. The Life of Mohammed prefixed to the third edition of his History, which was issued for the benefit of his destitute daughter in 1757, is by Roger Long.

Reputation and influence of the work

Ockley based his work on an Arabic manuscript in the Bodleian Library which later scholars have pronounced less trustworthy than he imagined it to be. Stanley Lane-Poole in the Dictionary of National Biography wrote that:

citing the opinion of William Robertson Smith in the article on Ockley from the ninth edition of the Encyclopædia Britannica. The author in question is now known as pseudo-Waqidi. Lane-Poole notes that the History

Alfred Rayney Waller described the author's work:

The 1720 play The Siege of Damascus by John Hughes drew inspiration from the first volume of the work.

References

External links 
 § 2. Ockley’s History of the Saracens in The Cambridge History of English and American Literature in 18 Volumes (1907–21).

1708 books
1718 books
18th-century history books
History books about the Middle East
Non-Islamic Islam studies literature